Breed method is a laboratory technique used for counting microorganisms in milk. It was introduced in 1910 by American biologists Samuel Cate Prescott and Robert Stanley Breed.

Purpose 
It is a method for somatic cell count, to know the number of living and dead microorganisms. When the method only recounts living organisms is called "viable count".

There are many methods for the quantification of microorganisms, including microscopy methods, Coulter counter, Mass Spectrometry (for estimating cell mass), and Cell Culture methods which form and grow colonies of bacteria.

The existing security in dairy products is given by the microbiological quality of the same, which ensures consumption from the point of view of health.

The analysis of the quality of raw milk is a common practice in the dairy industry and aims to control the quality of the samples and the material introduced into the processing plant, culminating in a mass-consumption to ensure quality standards.

Sample preparation 
It is important first, to homogenize milk, heating it in a water bath at 40 °C for somatic cells that float to the surface along with the fat. The laboratory apparatus must be clean but not necessarily sterile, since the method is based on cell count and asepsis is not accurate. If later it is going to make detailed microbiological analyzes on the same sample,  then it is necessary to be obtained and manipulated with sterile material.

After this process, the sample is transported to the laboratory in a 4 °C conservative container. It can be preserved in these conditions for 24 hours.

For sampling there are two basic conditions to consider:

The first one is to represent the total volume of milk from which it was removed, and the second condition involves to be stored and transported at the correct temperature so that they see their unmodified source properties, prior to analysis in the laboratory. In case of delay in completion of the analysis a preservative that not alter the subsequent analytical result should be added to the milk.

Application of the technique 
Be made extended and 0.01 mL of 1 cm2 on fat-free slides (which are cleaned with xylene).

After allowing to dry, it is colored and performs counting. For this, the average of existing cells is performed in the field of the microscope, dividing total somatic cells from microscopic factor (MF) which corresponds to the number of fields in one inch, i.e. 100 mm, obtaining in this way the number of somatic cells per milliliter of milk.

Microscopic Factor Calculation

Getting the Average

See also 
Somatic cell count

References 

Microbiology
Milk